Martin Atkins (born 4 April 1975) is an English darts player who competes for the Professional Darts Corporation. He is sometimes referred to as Martin Atkins (Wigan) to avoid confusion with another player named Martin Atkins, who comes from Leeds.

Career

After missing out on winning a PDC Tour Card in 2018, Atkins played the PDC Challenge Tour, and on the second day of competition, he won PDC Challenge Tour 3 by defeating Michael Barnard 5–4 in the final. Atkins qualified for the 2018 UK Open as an amateur Riley's qualifier, losing to fellow amateur Paul Whitworth 3–6.

He won a tour card at the 2020 Q-School, enabling him to compete on the 2020 PDC Pro Tour.

References

External links

1975 births
Living people
English darts players
British Darts Organisation players
Professional Darts Corporation former tour card holders